Streetlab is a live electronic rock production duo out of New York City formed by Mark "Coz" Lamorg and Ryan Leary. The two approach music with an appeal to both rockers and dancers.

The duo raised attention with many of their classic rock remixes, bringing music like Creedence Clearwater Revival and The Rolling Stones into the electronic/dance genre.

Streetlab has currently been remixing nonstop, and playing live shows in support of their debut EP. The two plan a second release of original music in mid-2009.

In the summer of 2009, the duo's single "NY Sound" was featured in Episode 2 of the sixth season of HBO's Entourage.

Music

Releases

Remixes

Mixes
 URB.com Artist of the Week Podcast: Streetlab 
 Subdrive Selektor Exclusive Mix 
 Nicky Digital Pre-Party Jamz: Streetlab

External links
Official Streetlab website

Electronic music duos